High Lake Township is one of twelve townships in Emmet County, Iowa, United States.  As of the 2000 census, its population was 461.

Geography
According to the United States Census Bureau, High Lake Township covers an area of 35.71 square miles (92.5 square kilometers); of this, 33.38 square miles (86.47 square kilometers, 93.48 percent) is land and 2.33 square miles (6.03 square kilometers, 6.52 percent) is water.

Cities, towns, villages
 Wallingford (east three-quarters)

Adjacent townships
 Center Township (north)
 Swan Lake Township (northeast)
 Jack Creek Township (east)
 Vernon Township, Palo Alto County (southeast)
 Walnut Township, Palo Alto County (south)
 Lost Island Township, Palo Alto County (southwest)
 Twelve Mile Lake Township (west)
 Estherville Township (northwest)

Cemeteries
The township contains these two cemeteries: High Lake and Wallingford.

Major highways
  Iowa Highway 4

Airports and landing strips
 Wallingford Landing Strip

Lakes
 Bur Oak Lake
 High Lake
 Ingham Lake

Landmarks
 Wolden County Park

School districts
 Estherville Lincoln Central Community School District
 Graettinger-Terril Community School District
 Armstrong-Ringsted Community School District

Political districts
 Iowa's 4th congressional district
 State House District 7
 State Senate District 4

References
 United States Census Bureau 2008 TIGER/Line Shapefiles
 United States Board on Geographic Names (GNIS)
 United States National Atlas

External links
 US-Counties.com
 City-Data.com

Townships in Emmet County, Iowa
Townships in Iowa